The Miss Utah USA competition is the pageant who selects the representative for the state of Utah in the Miss USA pageant. From 2001 to 2007, the pageant was produced by Red Curtain Productions. Casting Crowns Productions directed the pageant from 2007 to 2018 under the directorship of former Miss Missouri USA Britt Boyse. Smoak Productions became the new director for Miss and Teen pageants in 2019 under executive director and Miss USA 1995 Shanna Moakler.

Utah has been quite successful at Miss USA, with 20 placements as of 2009.  Their most consistent period was in the 1950s and 1960s.  Utah has produced one Miss USA in 1960 (Linda Bement, who went on to win the Miss Universe 1960 title). Miss Utah USA 1957, Charlotte Sheffield, also won the Miss USA 1957 crown after the original titleholder (Leona Gage of Maryland) was dethroned. Utah has a strong recent record, having placed in four out of five pageants between 2005 and 2009. The most recent placement was JessiKate Riley in 2021, placing in the top 16 becoming the state's placement since 2013.

Three Miss Utah USAs are former Miss Utah Teen USAs who competed at Miss Teen USA.  All three placed at Miss USA, which eclipsed their Teen performances. They are also very similar to the Miss North Carolina USA titleholders who also placed at Miss USA rather than Miss Teen USA. Two also competed in Miss Utah.

The current titleholder is Elisabeth Gandara of Salt Lake City and was crowned on May 28, 2022 at Capitol Theatre in Salt Lake City. She represented Utah for the title of Miss USA 2022.

Results summary

Placements
Miss USA: Linda Bement (1960)
1st runners-up: Charlotte Sheffield (1957)
2nd runners-up: Susan Gasser (1982)
3rd runners-up: Janet Joy Erikson (1964), Laura Chukanov (2009), Marissa Powell (2013)
4th runners-up: Shauna Wood (1953)
Top 5/6: Temple Taggert (1997), Melissa Leigh Anderson (1998)
Top 10/12: Tracy Kennick (1996), Margo Flynn (1978), Heather Anderson (2007)
Top 15/16: Cheryl Brown (1956), Sandra Puch (1958), Janet Marie Hawley (1961), Patricia Profaizer (1962), Janice Sadler (1965), Denice Blair (1966), Marin Poole (2005), Julia Bachison (2008), Jamie Crandall (2011), JessiKate Riley (2021)

Utah holds a record of 22 placements at Miss USA.

Awards
 Miss Congeniality: Peggy Moore (1972)
 Miss Photogenic: Marissa Powell (2013)
 Best State Costume 2nd Place: JessiKate Riley (2021)

Winners

Color key

Notes

References

External links

Utah
Utah culture
Women in Utah
1952 establishments in Utah
Recurring events established in 1952
Annual events in Utah